This list of broadsides of major World War II ships ranks the total weight of projectiles that can be delivered in single broadsides by major vessels in service during World War II.  Listed are the broadsides in pounds and kilograms (for a single main battery salvo), as well as the range to which it can be fired in yards and kilometres and the maximum rate of fire in salvos per minute.

Items are listed in order of broadside weight.

Broadsides
Broadsides